Buzin is a village in Croatia. It is located just south of the Zagreb bypass and the adjacent D3/A3 interchange is named after it.

References

Populated places in the City of Zagreb